Marie of the Incarnation, also as Madame Acarie (1 February 1566–18 April 1618), was the foundress of the nuns of the Discalced Carmelite Order in France, who later became a lay sister of the Order. She has been called the "mother of Discalced Carmel in France".

Biography
"Le belle Acarie" ("the beautiful Acarie"), as she was known in Paris, was born Barbara Avrillot in Paris. Her family belonged to the higher bourgeois society in Paris. Her father, Nicholas Avrillot, was Accountant General in the Chamber of Paris, and chancellor of Marguerite of Navarre, first wife of Henry IV of France; while her mother, Marie Lhuillier was a descendant of Etienne Marcel, the famous prévôt des marchands (chief municipal magistrate). She was placed with the Poor Clares of the Abbey of Longchamp, where she had a maternal aunt,  for her education, and acquired there a vocation for the cloister. In 1584, through obedience she married Pierre Acarie, viscount of Villemor, a wealthy young man of high standing, who was a fervent Catholic, to whom she bore seven children. Pierre Acarie  disapproved of Barbe's reading romance novels  and with clerical advice removed the books and substituted books of a  more pious and spiritual bent.

Pierre Acarie was one of the staunchest members of the Catholic League, which, after the death of Henry III of France, opposed the succession of the Huguenot prince, Henry of Navarre, to the French throne. He was one of the sixteen who organized the resistance in Paris and partly responsible for the subsequent famine which resulted from the siege of Paris (1590). Mary was so wise in her almsgiving that during a famine the wealthy persons who desired to help the poor caused their alms to pass through her hands, and she was widely respected. After the dissolution of the League, brought about by the abjuration of Henry IV, Acarie was exiled from Paris and his wife had to remain behind to contend with creditors and businessmen for her children's fortune, which had been compromised by her husband's want of foresight and prudence. She defended her husband in court, drafting memoirs, writing letters and furnishing proofs of his innocence. He was acquitted and enabled to return to the city after three years. In addition she was afflicted with physical sufferings, the consequences of a fall from her horse, and a very severe course of treatment left her an invalid for the rest of her life.

At the beginning of the seventeenth century, Acarie was widely known for her virtue, her supernatural gifts, and especially her charity towards the poor and the sick in the hospitals.   To her residence came all the distinguished and devout people of the day in Paris, among them Madame de Meignelay, née de Gondi, a model of Christian widows, Madame Jourdain and Madame de Bréauté, all future Carmelites, the Chancellor de Merillac, Père Coton, the Jesuit, as well as Vincent de Paul and Francis de Sales, who for six months was Acarie's spiritual director.

She is reputed to have had the gift of healing, the gift of prophecy, of predicting certain events in the future, of reading hearts and of discerning spirits. At the age of twenty-seven, she received the stigmata, the grace of physical conformity to the Suffering Christ. She is the first Frenchwoman the authenticity of whose stigmata (although invisible) have been attested by eminent persons.

In 1601 she was introduced to the Life of St Teresa of Avila and was greatly moved by her life.
A few days later Teresa, appeared to her and informed her that God wished to make use of her to found Carmelite convents in France. The apparitions continuing, Acarie took counsel and began the work. A meeting in which Pierre de Bérulle, future founder of the Oratory of Jesus, Francis de Sales, the Abbé de Brétigny, and the Marillac's took part, decided on the foundation of the "Reformed Carmel in France", 27 July 1602. St Frances the Sales was the one who wrote to the pope to obtain authorization and Pope Clement VIII granted the Bull of institution on 23 November 1603. The following year some Spanish Carmelites were received into the Carmel of Rue St. Jacques, which became celebrated. Mme de Longueville, Anne de Gonzague, Mlle de la Vallieres, withdrew to it; there also Bossuet and Fénelon were to preach. The Carmel spread rapidly and profoundly influenced French society of the day. Barbara Acarie also cooperated in the new foundations of Pontoise (1605), Dijon (1605) and Amiens (1606). In 1618, the year of Mme Acarie's death, it numbered fourteen houses.

Mme Acarie also shared in two foundations of the day, that of the Oratory and that of the Ursulines. On 11 November 1611, she, with Vincent de Paul, assisted at the Mass of the installation of the Oratory of France. Among the many postulants whom Mme Acarie received for the Carmel, there were some who had no vocation, and she conceived the idea of getting them to undertake the education of young girls, and broached her plan to her holy cousin, Mme. de Sainte-Beuve. To establish the new Order, they brought Ursulines to Paris and adopted their rule and name.

When her husband died in 1613, his widow settled her affairs and begged leave to enter the Carmel, asking as a favour to be received as a secular sister in the poorest community. In 1614 she withdrew to the monastery of Amiens, taking the name of Marie of the Incarnation. Her three daughters had preceded her into the cloister, and one of them, Margaret of the Blessed Sacrament, was sub-prioress at Amiens. She made her solemn profession on 8 April 1615, in the course of a prolonged sickness. She was heavily influenced by the piety exhibited in the death of St. Francis Xavier, and asserted a desire to die as he had died, namely, bereft of all physical recourse. In 1616, for reasons of health, she was sent to the Carmelite convent at Pontoise, where she died at the age of fifty-two. St. Francis de Sales considered her death in spiritual poverty as laudable as that of St. Francis Xavier's, who died in utter physical poverty.

Veneration
Paul de Montis wrote a biography on the Carmelite, which was published in 1778. Acarie was beatified by Pope Pius VI in 1791. That year, another biography appeared. Another biography followed suit, as the established religion regained lost ground after the Revolutionary Period in France. Acarie's mortal remains are in the chapel of the Carmelites of Pontoise. Her feast is celebrated on 18 April.

Legacy
She is primarily noted for the introduction of the reform of Teresa of Jesus into France, so much so that she merits the title of "mother and foundress of the (Discalced) Carmel in France".

Evelyn Underhill regarded the vigorous and saintly Madame Acarie as providing the first definite impulsion towards that interior growth which made the exquisite and urbane Francis de Sales a fit guide for the soul of St. Jane Frances de Chantal.

See also
 Margaret of the Blessed Sacrament - her daughter Marguerite

References

External links
Bowles, Emily. A Gracious Life, being the life of Barbara Acarie, Burns and Oates, London, 1879

1566 births
1618 deaths
Nuns from Paris
Discalced Carmelite nuns
Carmelite mystics
Venerated Carmelites
French beatified people
Carmelite beatified people
Burials in Île-de-France
17th-century venerated Christians
16th-century Christian mystics
17th-century Christian mystics
Stigmatics
Beatifications by Pope Pius VI